The Jacksonville micropolitan area may refer to:

The Jacksonville, Illinois micropolitan area, United States
The Jacksonville, Texas micropolitan area, United States

See also
Jacksonville metropolitan area (disambiguation)
Jacksonville (disambiguation)